The Shopworn Angel is a 1928 American part-talking romantic drama film directed by Richard Wallace starring Nancy Carroll and Gary Cooper. The film was released by Paramount Pictures in a silent version as well as a sound version using the Movietone sound-on-film system. This film was owned by Turner Entertainment and was distributed through Warner Bros.

Plot summary

Cast
 Nancy Carroll as Daisy Heath
 Gary Cooper as William Tyler
 Paul Lukas as Bailey
 Roscoe Karns as the Dance Director
 Emmett King as The Chaplain
 Mildred Washington as Daisy's Maid
 Bert Woodruff as Bit Part (uncredited)

Sound
This film was nearing completion when The Jazz Singer (1927) was released. Dialogue was written for Gary Cooper and Nancy Carroll to compete with "talking pictures". The last scene was a wedding and the only lines of dialogue spoken in the film are Cooper's "I do" and Carroll's "I do". In addition, Carroll is also heard singing the theme song.

Preservation status
This film survives in an incomplete form at the Library of Congress.

References

External links
 
 
 

1928 films
1920s war drama films
American black-and-white films
American romantic drama films
American war drama films
Films based on short fiction
Films directed by Richard Wallace
Paramount Pictures films
Films with screenplays by Howard Estabrook
Transitional sound films
American World War I films
Films set in 1917
1928 romantic drama films
1920s English-language films
1920s American films